Josef Neruda (16 January 1807, Mohelno – 18 February 1875, Brno) was a Moravian organist and music teacher. Josef was a great-grandson of the composer Johann Baptist Georg Neruda.

Life
Josef Neruda learned the basics of organ playing in the Rajhrad monastery. In his youth, he was a teacher assistant in Náměšť nad Oslavou, besides this he played in Haugwitz chapel and taught piano in Olomouc. In 1832, he accepted an offer to become the minister organist in Brno. He kept this position for 36 years.

Family
Josef Neruda had musically talented children. He toured all over the Europe with some of them under the name Neruda Quartet.

 Amálie Neruda (married Wickenhauser, 1834–1890), a pianist and a teacher, one of her students was Leoš Janáček
 Viktor Neruda (1836–1852), a cellist, died during the Russian concert tour in Saint Petersburg
 Wilma Neruda, Lady Hallé (1838–1911), a virtuoso violinist, married conductor Charles Hallé
 Maria Neruda (1840-1920), a violinist, married the singer and composer Fritz Arlberg
 Franz Xaver Neruda (1843-1915), a cellist who later became professor at the conservatories in Saint Petersburg and Copenhagen
 Olga Neruda (1858-1945), a pianist.

1807 births
1875 deaths
People from Třebíč District
People from the Margraviate of Moravia
Czech classical organists
Male classical organists
19th-century organists
19th-century Czech musicians
19th-century Czech male musicians
Musicians from Brno
19th-century classical musicians